The Race for Space is a 1959 American documentary film directed by David L. Wolper. It was nominated for an Academy Award for Best Documentary Feature. The film was a coproduction between Wolper Productions, the U.S. Department of Defense, and the U.S.S.R. Ministry of Culture.

Cast
 Esther Goddard as herself - Interviewee
 Holger N. Toftoy as himself - Interviewee
 Mike Wallace as narrator

References

Further reading

External links
 Official website: 

1959 films
1959 documentary films
American documentary films
Documentary films about the space program of the United States
1950s English-language films
1950s American films